The men's 5000 metres competition at the 2012 Summer Olympics in London, United Kingdom. The event was held at the Olympic Stadium on 8–11 August. In a tactical, slow race, the gold medal was won by reigning World champion Mo Farah of host Great Britain, completing a distance double having won the 10,000 metres a week earlier. Ethiopia's Dejen Gebremeskel took silver, with Thomas Pkemei Longosiwa of Kenya in bronze position.

Summary 

The final race started out slowly, the first lap in 74.1 and only that fast because Hayle Ibrahimov accelerated the last 100.  The field continued running splits in the 70s, Lopez Lomong leading through 2000 in a pedestrian 5:56.7.  In the seventh lap Yenew Alamirew moved to the front and accelerated the pace, the next several laps down below 62, Mo Farah the only one to break up the Ethiopian team at the front.  With 700 to go, Farah took the lead, his training partner Galen Rupp joining him with 500 to go, as the rest of the field jostling to be in position to sprint.  First Hagos Gebrhiwet challenged, then disappeared.  Down the backstretch, Thomas Pkemei Longosiwa challenged, with Abdalaati Iguider immediately behind.  Dejen Gebremeskel, Bernard Lagat and Isiah Kiplangat Koech packing up around the final turn.  At the head of the stretch, Koech contacted Lagat as he was just coming clear to sprint, Lagat stumbling.  Meanwhile, Farah was accelerating ahead of Longosiwa, who couldn't handle the speed.  Gebremeskel went around the outside with Lagat's delayed sprint unable to catch Longosiwa.  The winning time was more than 15 seconds slower than the slowest time in qualifying.

Competition format

The Men's 5000m competition consisted of heats (Round 1) and a Final. A total of fifteen competitors qualified for the Final from the heats.

Records
Prior to this competition, the existing world and Olympic records were as follows:

Schedule

All times are British Summer Time (UTC+1)

Results

Round 1

Qual. rule: first 5 of each heat (Q) plus the 5 fastest times (q) qualified.

Heat 1

 Hassan Hirt originally finished 11th in a time of 13:35.36, but was later disqualified after testing positive for EPO.

Heat 2

Final

Notes: Q- Qualified by place
q - Qualified by performance (time)
PB - Personal Best
NR - National Record
SB - Seasonal Best
DQ - DisQualified
DNS - Did Not Start
DNF - Did Not Finish

References

Athletics at the 2012 Summer Olympics
5000 metres at the Olympics
Men's events at the 2012 Summer Olympics